Brock may refer to:

Businesses
 Brock Motors, a short-lived automotive company founded in 1921 in Amherstberg, Ontario
 Crowne Plaza Niagara Falls – Fallsview also known as the Brock Hotel, a hotel in Niagara Falls, Ontario
 Brock Hotel Corporation, founded by Robert L. Brock

Fictional characters
 Brock (Pokémon), a character and the Gym Leader of Pewter City in the fictional world of Pokémon, and one of the main characters in the Pokémon anime
 The Brocks, a family on the American television show Picket Fences
 Eddie Brock, the longtime host of the Marvel alien symbiote Venom
 John Brock, a fictional British undercover agent created by Desmond Skirrow
 Matthew Brock, a news reporter on the American sitcom NewsRadio
 Brock Leighton, a character in the TV series Braceface
 Brock Lovett, a character in the 1997 film Titanic
 Tommy Brock the badger from The Tale of Mr. Tod by Beatrix Potter
 Brock Cantillo, on Breaking Bad the son of character Andrea Cantillo
 Brock Samson, a character in the animated television series The Venture Bros.
Brock, a character in the TV series Unikitty.

People
 Brock (surname), various people with this surname
 Brock (given name), various people with this given name

Places
In Canada
 Brock, Ontario, a township
 Brock, Saskatchewan, a village
 Rural Municipality of Brock No. 64, Saskatchewan
 Brock Island, a Canadian arctic island in the Northwest Territories
In England
 Brock, a small village in Lancashire, England
 River Brock, a river in Lancashire, England
In the United States:
 Brock, Missouri, an unincorporated community
 Brock, Nebraska, a village
 Brock, Ohio, an unincorporated community
 Brock, Texas, an unincorporated community

Schools
 Brock University, a comprehensive university located in St. Catharines, Ontario, Canada
 Brock High School (Ontario), a high school in Brock, Ontario
 Brock High School (Texas), a high school in Brock, Texas

Ships
 HMS Sir Isaac Brock, a British naval vessel destroyed at the Battle of York prior to being completed
 USS Brock (APD-93), a United States Navy high-speed transport in commission from 1945 to 1947

Other uses
 Brock, a traditional name for a badger
 Team Brock (disambiguation), a series of Australian motor racing teams
 Brock (miniseries), an Australian mini-series based on the life of motor racing driver Peter Brock
 Operation Brock, a Brexit traffic management plan

See also
Brock River (disambiguation)
Broc (disambiguation)
Brok (disambiguation)